Pamela Thomas-Graham (born June 24, 1963) is an American businesswoman, corporate leader, and author. In August 2016, Thomas-Graham was elected by the Clorox Company board of directors as the lead independent director. Previously, she was a senior executive at Credit Suisse, and served on the bank's 10-member executive board, until October 2015; was a partner at McKinsey and Company; president and CEO of CNBC; and Group President of Liz Claiborne.

Biography

Early life and education
Thomas-Graham was raised in Detroit, Michigan, with her older brother, Vincent, where her mother, Marian, was a social worker, and her father, Albert, a Detroit city government employee, "worked in real estate", as the deputy director of the Buildings and Safety Engineering Department.

Thomas-Graham graduated Phi Beta Kappa from Harvard University with a B.A. in economics, magna cum laude, in 1985.

She graduated from Harvard Business School with an MBA in 1988, and from Harvard Law School with a Juris Doctor in 1989. She was an editor of Harvard Law Review.

Career
Thomas-Graham began her career at Goldman, Sachs & Co., where she was a summer associate in the investment banking division while she was student at Harvard Business School. In 1995, she was the first African American woman to become partner at the international management consulting firm McKinsey & Company.

In 1999, Thomas-Graham joined NBC as president of CNBC.com and in 2001, she became chief executive of the cable TV network CNBC. Her successful launch of the network's business website became a Harvard Business School Case study authored by Harvard Business School Professor Rosabeth Moss Kanter. In September 2005, she left CNBC and was hired as president of Liz Claiborne, Inc.

In January 2010, Thomas-Graham joined the executive board of Credit Suisse as Chief Talent, Branding and Communications Officer. In August 2016, she was elected by Clorox to serve as the Lead independent director of its board..

Thomas-Graham serves on the board of the New York Philharmonic and the Parsons School of Design. She is a member of the Economic Club of New York and the Council on Foreign Relations.

Thomas-Graham is the author of a three-title book series, "Ivy League Mysteries", published by Simon & Schuster: A Darker Shade Of Crimson (1998), Blue Blood (1999), and Orange Crushed (2004).

Thomas-Graham is the creator and owner of Dandelion Chandelier, a blog that explores the intersection of luxury, wellness, marketing, and technology.

Personal life
Thomas-Graham and her late husband the author and attorney, Lawrence Otis Graham (1961–2021) have three children together and lived in New York City.

References 

African-American novelists
American mystery writers
People from Chappaqua, New York
American women chief executives
Harvard Business School alumni
Harvard Law School alumni
McKinsey & Company people
1963 births
Living people
African-American women in business
20th-century American businesspeople
20th-century American businesswomen
20th-century American novelists
20th-century American women writers
21st-century American businesspeople
21st-century American novelists
21st-century American women writers
American women novelists
Women mystery writers
20th-century African-American women writers
20th-century African-American writers
21st-century African-American women writers
21st-century African-American writers
Harvard College alumni